A needle drop is a version of a recording that has been transferred from a vinyl record to digital audio or other formats. Needle drops are sometimes traded among music collectors, especially when the original vinyl recording has not been released officially on a subsequent consumer format. It is also referred to as a "vinyl rip" or "record rip".

Other reasons for trading needle drops include the lack of availability of certain recordings on digital media, the non-availability of less compressed versions in digital form, or the lack of availability of certain versions or mixes of that recording, e.g. mono or stereo versions, or the loss of the master tape. The term is thought to have been coined in 1949 by Peter Goldmark during the first rush of transfers of lacquer and 78 RPM records to the then-new long playing 33 ⅓ RPM format.

Needledrop (usually as one word) is also used in the advertising industry for audio "that is prefabricated, multipurpose, and highly conventional... an inexpensive substitute for original music; paid for on a one-time basis, it is dropped into a commercial or film when a particular normative effect is desired."

See also
 Loudness war

References

Audio engineering
Music production
1940s neologisms